Lamar J. Lundy, Jr. (April 17, 1935 – February 24, 2007) was an American defensive end with the Los Angeles Rams of the National Football League for 13 seasons, from 1957 to 1969. Along with Deacon Jones, Merlin Olsen, and Rosey Grier, Lundy was a member of the Fearsome Foursome, often considered one of the best defensive lines in NFL history. All four also did some acting; Lundy portrayed the boulder-hurling cyclops in the unaired pilot of Lost in Space (this pilot was later made into episode 4 of the series, entitled "There Were Giants in the Earth").

Lundy was born in Richmond, Indiana, and graduated from Richmond High School; a 2 sport star, Lamar led the Red Devils to the State Finals in basketball, playing for Hall of Fame Coach, Art Beckner.  He was selected to the Indiana All-Star team; he was also an All-State player in football.  When it came time to choose a college, Lamar selected and attended Purdue University, where he was the first black student to receive a football scholarship, and where he was named MVP of both the football and basketball teams in his senior year.  He led the football team in receiving his senior season and was a 2x All-Big Ten (2nd Team) end.  As a collegiate basketball player, Lamar scored 678 points (#73 all-time for the Boilermakers) and collected 533 rebounds (#29 all-time for the Boilermakers).  He was a 3rd team All-Big Ten Center in 1957.  The 6'7" Lundy was drafted by both the NFL and the NBA, but he opted for a career in football. Early in his professional career, Lundy (#85) was occasionally used as an offensive receiver, catching 35 passes for 584 yards and 6 touchdowns. He scored an additional 3 touchdowns on interception returns (coincidentally, on the only 3 interceptions of his NFL career). When he retired as a player, Lundy became an assistant coach for the San Diego Chargers, but was forced by illness to cease coaching.

Lundy died at age 71 on February 24, 2007. He was the first of the Fearsome Foursome to die. Lundy, who battled diabetes, Graves disease, myasthenia gravis, cancer, and heart disease, was survived by two adult sons, two adult daughters, and many grandchildren.

Honors
 Selected to play in the 1959 NFL Pro Bowl.
 Selected to the NFL All-Pro team in 1967.
 Inducted into the Indiana Football Hall of Fame in 1975.
 Inducted into the Indiana Basketball Hall of Fame in 1990.
 Inducted into the Purdue University Intercollegiate Athletics Hall of Fame in 1995
 The National Rd. West Bridge, in his hometown of Richmond, Indiana, was renamed "Lamar Lundy Memorial Bridge" in honor of him.

References

External links
 Indiana Basketball Hall of Fame profile
 
 

1935 births
2007 deaths
American football defensive ends
American football defensive tackles
Los Angeles Rams players
Purdue Boilermakers football players
Purdue Boilermakers men's basketball players
Western Conference Pro Bowl players
Sportspeople from Richmond, Indiana
Players of American football from Indiana
Basketball players from Indiana
African-American players of American football
African-American basketball players
Burials at Earlham Cemetery, Richmond, Indiana
American men's basketball players
20th-century African-American sportspeople
21st-century African-American people